Richard Duane Hongisto (December 16, 1936, Bovey, Minnesota – November 4, 2004, San Francisco, California) was a businessman, politician, sheriff, and police chief of San Francisco, California, and Cleveland, Ohio.

Early life and education 
Of Finnish descent, Hongisto was the son of Gladys Longrie and Raymond Hongisto. In 1942, Dick moved to San Francisco with his parents and brother Don.  Dick grew up in the Sunset District, where he graduated from George Washington High School. He later attended San Francisco City College.  While completing a bachelor's degree at San Francisco State University, Hongisto became an officer of the San Francisco Police Department (SFPD).

Career

Early career 

As a police officer, Hongisto earned a reputation for activism, fighting discrimination within the police force and against police brutality.  He was a co-founder of Officers for Justice, an organization of officers who were primarily racial minorities or gay.

Hongisto's activism made him controversial among the ranks of the SFPD, but at the same time he was a popular public figure.  He ran for sheriff in 1971, and was elected — an event that shocked the San Francisco political establishment. The incumbent, Matthew Carberry, had been a four-term sheriff, was well-connected politically, and had been considered a shoo-in for a return to the job.

Hongisto's election had been orchestrated methodically by computer analyst Les Morgan, using the then-new idea of precinct analysis of voting trends.  Hongisto was considered the first candidate for public office in San Francisco to be elected largely by outsiders: gay, Latino, and other minority voters who had a strong voting presence, but who had been ignored by the political establishment.

He was the first sheriff to hire gay and lesbian deputies, and later became embroiled in controversy when he deliberately delayed the eviction of residents from the International Hotel, a residential hotel in Manilatown.
  After a long period where he refused to order the eviction, which included time spent in the San Mateo County jail on contempt of court charges, Hongisto eventually carried out the mass eviction, which earned him the enmity of some of the very people he tried to protect.

Cleveland 

After serving as the sheriff in San Francisco, Hongisto briefly moved to Cleveland, Ohio in 1977, where he served as police chief under Mayor Dennis Kucinich. His penchant for controversy, and conflicts with Kucinich, eventually led to his being fired by the mayor on live local television. In Cleveland his firing sparked a recall drive to remove Kucinich from office.

New York State 

The Governor of the State of New York then invited Hongisto to manage that state's prison system. Hongisto accepted the challenge of reforming a system that had been plagued by riots and unrest within several of its facilities.  Permanent appointment to this position required confirmation by the state senate, which was not forthcoming.  Hongisto therefore returned to San Francisco to run for supervisor in 1980.

Return to San Francisco 

Upon his return to San Francisco, Hongisto was elected to the San Francisco Board of Supervisors, where he helped to place Proposition M, a measure which would limit construction of high rise commercial buildings, on the public ballot. The measure passed overwhelmingly, and has to this day continued to impact the development of San Francisco's skyline.

With the endorsement of then-Mayor Art Agnos, Hongisto later ran for the office of Assessor.

In 1991, he ran for mayor but did not make the run-off, coming in fourth. After declining to endorse Agnos for re-election as mayor, in a race won by police chief Frank Jordan, Hongisto was appointed in 1992 by Jordan to be San Francisco's police chief.

Hongisto's tenure as police chief lasted only six weeks, and was punctuated by controversy over his handling of demonstrations and riots which occurred in the wake of the Rodney King police brutality trial in Los Angeles. Hongisto cordoned off an entire neighborhood in the Mission district on a Saturday afternoon, establishing a net that saw the arrests of all people on the street, demonstrators and ordinary citizens alike. Hongisto had rented city buses to transport the arrested citizens, and they were processed at a warehouse on San Francisco's wharfs. Instead of merely citing and releasing those arrested, Hongisto ordered that they be arrested and processed at the Santa Rita jail in Dublin (Alameda County), rather than in San Francisco County, thus ensuring that they would not be able to avail themselves of their civil rights and return to San Francisco. This enraged progressive activists and civil libertarians as well as the San Francisco Board of Supervisors, which ordered Hongisto to release the citizens he had arrested. On the following Saturday, Hongisto ordered police to disrupt another demonstration and arrested demonstrators with no order to disperse. Both incidences were later the targets of class action suits against the city of San Francisco, although the former, undertaken by the Lawyer's Guild, would not be resolved for nearly a decade.

Soon thereafter, a gay and lesbian community newspaper, the San Francisco Bay Times, published a cover graphic of Hongisto's head pasted on the body of a lesbian activist. The activist, dressed in a police uniform, held a giant baton with one end protruding from the groin area as if it were an erect penis. The  headline screamed, "Dick's Cool New Tool: Martial Law", in reference to the police actions. What happened afterwards is subject to dispute. Hongisto claimed that he had asked members of the police union to gather copies of the paper to show members of the rank and file what he was enduring in the activist press, in reaction to their criticism of his supposedly failing to properly defend their conduct of the arrests during the King riots.  Around 2,000 copies of the free papers were taken from news racks by three officers and later found stored at the Mission District police station.  Hongisto was publicly accused of ordering the confiscation of the papers in attempt at censorship, a charge he continued to deny up to his death. After a hearing, which many considered to be highly politicized, the San Francisco Police Commission found him culpable, and Mayor Jordan dismissed him. One of those three officers, Gary Delagnes, is now president of the San Francisco Police Officers Association.

Later years 

Hongisto left public life to become a full-time businessman and real estate investor, apart from an unsuccessful run for County Supervisor in 2000.

Hongisto died of a heart attack on November 4, 2004, at the age of 67, leaving behind a son and daughter. He married four times, and was living with a 31-year-old girlfriend at the time of his death.

Electoral history

References

External links 
SF Chronicle obituary
George Washington High School GWHS, San Francisco.

1936 births
2004 deaths
20th-century American politicians
American people of Finnish descent
California sheriffs
Cleveland Division of Police
People from Bovey, Minnesota
San Francisco Board of Supervisors members
San Francisco Police Department chiefs